Carlos Parteli Keller (Rivera, 8 March 1910 – Montevideo, 26 May 1999) was a Uruguayan Roman Catholic cleric.

Biography
At 13 years of age he entered the Minor Seminary and at 16 he was sent to Rome by the second Bishop of Melo José Joaquín Arrospide to study at the South American College in Rome. He studied philosophy and theology and was ordained priest on Holy Saturday of 1933 in the Church of San Juan Bautista Berrán.  On his return to Uruguay he served as parish priest of the Cathedral of Florida until 1939, when he became secretary of Bishop Miguel Paternain.

In 1942 he moved to Rivera, where he was appointed pastor of the Immaculate Conception Parish Church. Later, in 1960, he was appointed bishop of then newly created Roman Catholic Diocese of Tacuarembó.

He was appointed Coadjutor Archbishop of Montevideo and titular bishop of Turris in Mauretania in 1966. A decade later, on 17 November 1976, he succeeded as Archbishop of Montevideo.

At the age of 75 years in 1985 Partelli provided renounces to his title and went to reside in an adjoining inter-diocesan seminary, near San Carlos Borromeo Parish in Millan Avenue. He died in 1999.

External links

Bishops appointed by Pope John XXIII
20th-century Roman Catholic archbishops in Uruguay
1910 births
1999 deaths
People from Rivera Department
Uruguayan people of Italian descent
Uruguayan Roman Catholic archbishops
Roman Catholic bishops of Tacuarembó
Roman Catholic archbishops of Montevideo